Illustrious may refer to:

 HMS Illustrious, five ships in the Royal Navy
 Illustrious (album), a 2008 hip hop album by Big Noyd
 Illustrious class aircraft carrier, a class of aircraft carrier of the Royal Navy
 Mari Illustrious Makinami, fictional character of Rebuild of Evangelion

See also

 Illustriousness
 Antiochus IV Epiphanes